Wonseo-dong is a dong, neighbourhood of Jongno-gu in Seoul, South Korea. It is a legal dong (법정동 ) administered under its administrative dong (행정동 ), Gahoe-dong.

See also 
Administrative divisions of South Korea

References

External links
 
Status quo of Jongno-gu by administrative dong 
Gahoe-dong Resident office 

Neighbourhoods of Jongno-gu